Honorary whites was a political terminology that was used by the apartheid regime of South Africa to grant some of the rights and privileges of whites to those who would otherwise have been treated as non-whites under the Population Registration Act. It was enacted by the then ruling National Party (NP).

This was made on a case by case basis to select individuals such as for sport events but also towards certain racial groups, notably East Asians who were ascribed as honorary whites. Such examples include the Japanese, Koreans (although this status was rejected by the South Korean state), residents of Hong Kong and Taiwanese who were granted this "honorary white" status, and later the local Chinese community of South Korea and individually designated figures of various other races were added as well, such as Austronesians.

Japanese

The designation was ascribed to the entire Japanese populace (who also once were ascribed as Honorary Aryans by Nazi Germany) in the 1960s. At the time, Japan was going through a post-war economic miracle, and this designation assisted a trade pact formed between South Africa and Japan in the early 1960s, when Tokyo's Yawata Iron & Steel Co. offered to purchase 5 million tonnes of South African pig iron, worth more than $250 million, over a 10-year period.

With such a huge deal in the works, then Prime Minister Hendrik Verwoerd determined that it would be tactless and disadvantageous to trade arrangements to subject the Japanese people to the same restrictions as other ethnicities because trade delegations from Japan would regularly visit South Africa for business and trade.

Afterward, Pretoria's Group Areas Board publicly announced that all Japanese people would be considered white. Johannesburg's city officials even decided that, "in view of the trade agreements", the municipal swimming pools would be open to all Japanese guests.

The designation gave the Japanese almost all of the same rights and privileges as whites (except for the right to vote; they were also exempt from conscription). Until the early 1970s, opposition party politicians and the press questioned why Japanese were granted special privileges, citing hypocrisy and inconsistencies with apartheid.

Chinese

Chinese South Africans

Chinese South Africans are Overseas Chinese who reside in South Africa, including those whose ancestors came to South Africa in the early 20th century until Chinese immigration was banned under the Chinese Exclusion Act of 1904.

As with other non-White South Africans, the Chinese suffered from discrimination during apartheid, and were often classified as Coloureds, but sometimes as Asians, a category that was generally reserved for Indian South Africans. Under the apartheid-era Population Registration Act, 1950, Chinese South Africans were deemed "Asiatic", then "Coloured", where they were forcefully removed from areas declared "Whites only" areas by the government under the Group Areas Act in 1950 and governed as "Coloured".

The new designation of "Honorary whites" granted in the 1960s to the Japanese seemed grossly unfair to South Africa's small Chinese community (roughly 7,000 at that time), who, it seemed, would enjoy none of the new benefits given to the Japanese. As Time quoted one of Cape Town's leading Chinese businessmen, "If anything, we are whiter in appearance than our fellow Japanese friends." Another indignantly demanded: "Does this mean that the Japanese, now that they are "considered" white, cannot associate with us without running afoul of the Immorality Act?"

Furthermore, with the inclusion of other East Asians from Taiwan and Hong Kong as honorary whites complicated matters on how the local Chinese were treated, and apartheid regulation on Chinese varied from department to department and province to province as locals could not distinguish East Asians apart from each other, due to similar genetic traits and physical appearance. This caused confusion and discontent among the local Chinese community as they had less rights compared to Chinese from Taiwan and Hong Kong despite no differences in physical appearance. This uncertainty fueled the emigration of the Chinese South Africans to other countries like other "Coloureds" under the Apartheid regime, as it showed that such a status is much more geopolitical rather than racial. 

In 1984, the Group Areas Act was amended to allow Chinese South Africans to live in areas the government had declared white areas and use the facilities within them. Chinese South Africans were required to apply for a permit from the government in order to move into a white area. Restrictions still apply where a Chinese family that wanted to move into a white suburb had to ask the permission of their neighbours – 10 houses to the front, 10 to the back and 10 on each side of the house they intended to call home.

Taiwanese

The Apartheid regime enjoyed warm relationship with the Republic of China (ROC), informally Taiwan, as South Africa continued to recognize the Republic of China over the People's Republic of China (PRC) under the One China Policy. South Africa's National Party (NP) also supported Taiwan's Chinese Nationalists in their claimants to Mainland China and the South China Sea.

The inclusion of Taiwanese was an important decision for relations between South Africa and Taiwan, as both were becoming increasingly isolated from the international community and treated as pariah states; especially after the ROC lost its seat that represented "China" at the United Nations (UN) to the PRC with Resolution 2578. In 1980, Premier Sun Yun-suan made an official visit to the country. 

Granting Honorary White status to Taiwanese further warmed relations and allowed immigration of Chinese into South Africa since the enforcement of the Chinese Exclusion Act of 1904. Generous incentives and subsidies were offered to the Taiwanese to settle and invest in South Africa, and Taiwan had become South Africa's fifth largest trading partner by 1979, especially in regards to weapons exports which the country desperately needed due to sanctions while fighting the South African Border War.

Hong Kongers

Despite the apartheid regime's strained relationship with the United Kingdom, Hong Kong, then still a British colony, still maintained trade relationships with South Africa. In order to lure investment in South Africa, Hong Kongers were offered the honorary whites status by the government for living and investment purposes.

Koreans

Unlike Japan and Taiwan (ROC), South Korea was unwilling and uncomfortable of such a status and eventually outright refused to establish diplomatic relations with South Africa because of apartheid. Although South Africa offered honorary white status to South Korean citizens when the two countries negotiated diplomatic relations in 1961, South Korea severed ties with South Africa in 1978 in protest against apartheid, and full diplomatic relations between the two countries were not re-established until 1992, when apartheid was abolished.

Others
The "honorary white" status was given to other special visitors belonging to other races, including:
 Guyanese author E. R. Braithwaite, who wrote a scathing book Honorary White: Visit to South Africa about his stay;
 Cricketers in the West Indian rebel teams;
 Players of Polynesian (a sub group of Austronesian) Maori or Samoan backgrounds in the 1970 touring All Blacks rugby team
 Australian Aboriginal tennis player Evonne Goolagong Cawley.
 African American tennis player Arthur Ashe was also offered Honorary White status but he refused and explicitly demanded to be booked as a Black man when he visited and played in South Africa.
 Malawian diplomats

See also
 Honorary Aryan
 Honorary male
 Model minority
 Racial hierarchy
 Takao Ozawa v. United States
An Investigation of Global Policy with the Yamato Race as Nucleus
Sarah Rector ('Given her wealth, in 1913, the Oklahoma Legislature made an effort to have her declared white')

References

Apartheid in South Africa
Cultural assimilation
Ethnic groups in South Africa
Historical definitions of race
Japan–South Africa relations
Political terminology in South Africa
Role status
White South African culture